John J. O'Connell (April 30, 1919 – March 24, 1998) was an American lawyer and politician from Washington who served as the 13th Attorney General of Washington from 1957 to 1969.

Early life and education 
O'Connell was born and raised in Tacoma, Washington. He earned a Bachelor of Laws from the Gonzaga University School of Law and served as a Captain in the United States Army during World War II.

Career 
After serving in the Army, O'Connell returned to Tacoma and established a private legal practice. He served as the city prosecutor of Tacoma and county prosecutor of Pierce County, Washington. O'Connell was elected Attorney General of Washington in 1956, and served until 1969. O'Connell was succeeded in office by Slade Gorton. O'Connell was also the Democratic nominee in the 1968 Washington gubernatorial election, losing to Republican Daniel J. Evans. Soon after leaving office, O'Connell resumed his private legal practice.

Personal life 
O'Connell and his wife, Margaret, had six children. He died in Tacoma on March 24, 1998 at the age of 78.

References 

People from Tacoma, Washington
1919 births
1998 deaths
Washington (state) Attorneys General
Washington (state) lawyers
Washington (state) Democrats
Gonzaga University alumni
Gonzaga University School of Law alumni
20th-century American lawyers
United States Army personnel of World War II